The Calamian treeshrew (Tupaia palawanensis) is a treeshrew species found in the islands of Busuanga and Culion, which are part of the Calamian Islands group in the Philippines.

The German zoologist Paul Matschie first described a Calamian treeshrew from Culion that was part of a zoological collection obtained by the Berlin Zoological Museum in the present day the Natural History Museum, Berlin. He considered it a distinct species as this type specimen differed from the Palawan treeshrew by a slightly shorter muzzle, and a lighter colour of the toes, hair of the tail and chest.
It is now recognised as a synonym of the Palawan treeshrew.

References

Treeshrews
Mammals of the Philippines
Mammals described in 1898
Endemic fauna of the Philippines
Fauna of the Calamian Islands